Bushkan-e Deylami (also Romanized as Būshkān-e Deylamī; also known as Būshegān-e Deylamī, Būshgān, Būshgān-e Deylamī, and Būshīkān-e Deylamī) is a village in Anarestan Rural District, Chenar Shahijan District, Kazerun County, Fars Province, Iran. At the 2006 census, its population was 656, in 161 families.

References 

Populated places in Chenar Shahijan County